The Philippines is a developing mixed-market economy, which is one of the growing emerging markets with economic dynamism that sustain growth momentum. It is a founding member of Asia-Pacific Economic Cooperation and Association of Southeast Asian Nations.
The Philippine economy is the world's 40th largest by nominal GDP and 17th largest in Asia according to the International Monetary Fund in 2022.

The Philippines is considered a newly industrialized country, which has an economy in transition from one based on agriculture to one based more on services and manufacturing. As of 2021, its GDP by purchasing power parity was estimated at $1.47 trillion, the 18th largest in the world.

The country's primary exports include semiconductors and electronic products, transport equipments, garments, chemical products, copper, nickel, abaca, coconut oil, and fruits. Its major trading partners include Japan, China, the United States, Singapore, South Korea, the Netherlands, Hong Kong, Germany, Taiwan, and Thailand.  The Philippines has been named as one of the Tiger Cub Economies, alongside Indonesia, Malaysia, Vietnam, and Thailand. However, major problems remain, mainly related to alleviating the wide income and growth disparities between the country's different regions and socioeconomic classes, reducing corruption, and investing in the infrastructure necessary to ensure future growth. The Asian Development Bank (ADB) is headquartered in the Ortigas Center located in the city of Mandaluyong, Metro Manila.

The Philippine economy is projected to be the fourth largest in Asia and 19th largest in the world by 2050. By 2035, the Filipino economy is predicted to be the 22nd largest in the world.

Overview 

The Philippine economy has been growing steadily over decades and the International Monetary Fund in 2014 reported it as the 39th largest economy in the world. The Philippines posted a high GDP growth rate of 7.6% in 2022. However, the country is not a part of the Group of 20 nations; instead, it is grouped in a second tier for emerging markets or newly industrialized countries. Depending on the analyst, this second tier can go by the name the Next Eleven or the Tiger Cub Economies.

A chart below outlines selected statistics showing trends in the gross domestic product of the Philippines using data taken from the International Monetary Fund.

Composition by sector

As a newly industrialized country, the Philippines is still an economy with a large agricultural sector; however, the country's service industry has expanded recently. Much of the industrial sector is based on processing and assembly operations in the manufacturing of electronics and other high-tech components, usually from foreign multinational corporations.

Filipinos who go abroad to work–-known as Overseas Filipino Workers or OFWs—are a significant contributor to the economy but are not reflected in the below sectoral discussion of the domestic economy. OFW remittances is also credited for the Philippines' recent economic growth resulting in investment status upgrades from credit ratings agencies such as the Fitch Group and Standard & Poor's. From more than US$2 billion worth of remittance from Overseas Filipinos sent to the Philippines in 1994, this significantly increased to a record US$36.14 billion in 2022.

Agriculture

, agriculture employs 24% of the Filipino workforce accounting for 8.9% of the total GDP. The type of activity ranges from small subsistence farming and fishing to large commercial ventures with significant export focus.

The Philippines is the world's third largest producer of coconuts, and the world's largest exporter of coconut products. Coconut production in the Philippines is generally concentrated in medium-sized farms.
The Philippines is also the world's second largest producer of pineapples, producing 2,730,000 metric tons in 2018.

Rice production in the Philippines is important to the food supply in the country and economy. The Philippines is the 8th largest rice producer in the world, accounting for 2.8% of global rice production. Rice is the most important food crop, a staple food in most of the country. It is produced extensively in Luzon (especially Central Luzon), Western Visayas, Southern Mindanao and Central Mindanao.

The Philippines is one of the largest producers of sugar in the world. At least 17 provinces located in eight regions of the nation have grown sugarcane crops, of which the Negros Island Region accounts for half of the country's total production. As of Crop Year 2012–2013, 29 mills are operational divided as follows: 13 mills in Negros, 6 mills in Luzon, 4 mills in Panay, 3 mills in Eastern Visayas and 3 mills in Mindanao. A range from 360,000 to 390,000 hectares are devoted to sugarcane production. The largest sugarcane areas are found in the Negros Island Region, which accounts for 51% of sugarcane areas planted. This is followed by Mindanao which accounts for 20%; Luzon with 17%; Panay with 7% and Eastern Visayas with 4%.

Shipbuilding and repair
The Philippines is a major player in the global shipbuilding industry with shipyards in Subic, Cebu, Bataan, Navotas and Batangas. It became the fourth largest shipbuilding nation in 2010. Subic-made cargo vessels are now exported to countries where shipping operators are based. South Korea's Hanjin started production in Subic in 2007 of the 20 ships ordered by German and Greek shipping operators. The country's shipyards are now building ships like bulk carriers, container ships and big passenger ferries. General Santos' shipyard is mainly for ship repair and maintenance.

Being surrounded by waters, the country has abundant natural deep-sea ports ideal for development as production, construction and repair sites. In the ship repair sector, the Navotas complex in Metro Manila is expected to accommodate 96 vessels for repair.

Shipbuilding is part of Philippines' maritime heritage as it plays a vital role in contributing almost 30% of revenues in the portion of ocean-based industries on which it accounted for 3.6% of the total GDP in 2021.

Automotive and aerospace

The ABS used in Mercedes-Benz, BMW, and Volvo cars are made in the Philippines. Automotive sales in the Philippines increased to 352,596 units in 2022 from 268,488 units a year prior. Toyota sells the most vehicles in the country; this is followed by Mitsubishi, Ford, Nissan, and Suzuki. Honda and Suzuki produce motorcycles in the country. By 2011, China's Chery Automobile company is going to build their assembly plant in Laguna, that will serve and export cars to other countries in the region if monthly sales would reach 1,000 units.

Aerospace products in the Philippines are mainly for the export market and include manufacturing parts for aircraft built by both Boeing and Airbus. Moog is the biggest aerospace manufacturer with base in Baguio in the Cordillera region; the company produces aircraft actuators in their manufacturing facility. Total export output of aerospace products in the Philippines reached US$780 million in 2019.

Electronics
A Texas Instruments plant in Baguio has been operating for 20 years and is the largest producer of DSP chips in the world. Texas Instruments' Baguio plant produces all the chips used in Nokia cell phones and 80% of chips used in Ericsson cell phones in the world. Until 2005, Toshiba laptops were produced in Santa Rosa, Laguna. Presently the Philippine plant's focus is in the production of hard disk drives. Printer manufacturer Lexmark has a factory in Mactan in the Cebu region. Electronics and other light industries are concentrated in Laguna, Cavite, Batangas and other CALABARZON provinces with sizable numbers found in Southern Philippines that account for most of the country's export.

The Philippine Electronics Industry is classified into (73%) Semiconductor Manufacturing Services (SMS) and (27%) Electronics Manufacturing Services (EMS) according to SEIPI, the largest organization of foreign and Filipino electronics companies in the Philippines.
Electronic products continued to be the country's top export with total earnings of $42.49 billion and accounted for 56.9% of the total exports in 2021.

Mining and extraction

The country is rich in mineral and geothermal energy resources. In 2003, it produced 1931 MW of electricity from geothermal sources (27% of total electricity production), second only to the United States, and a recent discovery of natural gas reserves in the Malampaya oil fields off the island of Palawan is already being used to generate electricity in three gas-powered plants. Philippine gold, nickel, copper, palladium and chromite deposits are among the largest in the world. Other important minerals include silver, coal, gypsum, and sulphur. Significant deposits of clay, limestone, marble, silica, and phosphate exist.

About 60% of total mining production are accounted for by non-metallic minerals, which contributed substantially to the industry's steady output growth between 1993 and 1998, with the value of production growing 58%. In 1999, however, mineral production declined 16% to $793 million. Mineral exports have generally slowed since 1996. Led by copper cathodes, Philippine mineral exports amounted to $650 million in 2000, barely up from 1999 levels. Low metal prices, high production costs, lack of investment in infrastructure, and a challenge to the new mining law have contributed to the mining
industry's overall decline.

The industry rebounded starting in late 2004 when the Supreme Court upheld the constitutionality of an important law permitting foreign ownership of Philippines mining companies. However, the DENR has yet to approve the revised Department Administrative Order (DAO) that will provide the Implementing Rules and Regulations of the Financial and Technical Assistance Agreement (FTAA), the specific part of the 1994 Mining Act that allows 100% foreign ownership of Philippines mines.

In 2019, the country was the 2nd largest world producer of nickel and the 4th largest world producer of cobalt.

According to Philippine Statistics Authority, the total monetary value of four key metallic minerals which were appraised to Class A namely: copper, chromite, gold and nickel were valued at $7.68 billion in 2021. Class A mineral resources are those which are commercially recoverable that could contribute to economy annually.

Renewable energy resources 

The Philippines have a significant potential in solar energy, however, as of 2021 most of the domestically produced electricity is still based on fossil fuel resources, coal in particular. The future development of solar power and the phase-out of fossil fuels will depend on strong and effective renewable energy governance, improving regulatory and fiscal policies, facilitating market entry for renewable energy investors and active cooperation with international organizations.

On November 15, 2022, the renewable energy sector has been granted to operate in 100% foreign ownership from the current 40% cap to allow the entry of foreign capital to RE industries as the Department of Energy are targeting the renewable energy's share in the country's power generation mix from the current 22 to 35 percent by 2030 and 50 percent by 2040. The Board of Investments (BOI) said it approved a $6.61 billion offshore wind energy project of Danish RE company Copenhagen Energy A/S and PetroGreen Energy Corp. As of 2022, the share of RE in the energy mix was at 22.8%.

Offshoring and outsourcing 

Business process outsourcing (BPO) and the call center industry contribute to the Philippines' economic growth resulting in investment status upgrades from credit ratings agencies such as Fitch and S&P. In 2008, the Philippines has surpassed India as the world leader in business process outsourcing (BPO). The industry generated 100,000 jobs, and total revenues were placed at $960 million for 2005. In 2011, BPO sector employment ballooned to over 700,000 people and is contributing to a growing middle class; this increased to around 1.3 million employees by 2022. BPO facilities are concentrated in IT parks and centers in Economic Zones across the Philippines— mainly in Metro Manila and Cebu City although other regional areas such as Baguio, Bacolod, Cagayan de Oro, Clark Freeport Zone, Dagupan, Davao City, Dumaguete, Lipa, Iloilo City, and Naga City, Camarines Sur are now being promoted and developed for BPO operations. The majority of the top ten BPO firms of the United States operate in the Philippines.

Call centers began in the Philippines as plain providers of email response and managing services and is a major source of employment. Call center services include customer relations, ranging from travel services, technical support, education, customer care, financial services, online business to customer support, and online business-to-business support. The Philippines is considered as a location of choice due to its many outsourcing benefits such as less expensive operational and labor costs, the high proficiency in spoken English of a significant number of its people, and a highly educated labor pool.

The growth in the BPO industry is promoted by the Philippine government. The industry is highlighted by the Philippines Development Plan as among the 10 high potential and priority development areas. To further entice investors, government programs include different incentives such as tax holidays, tax exemptions, and simplified export and import procedures. Additionally, training is also available for BPO applicants.

Tourism

Regional accounts 
According to the Philippine Statistics Authority (PSA), gross regional domestic product (GRDP) is GDP measured at regional levels. Figures below are for the year 2019.

International comparisons

Statistics 

GDP-related data can be found here:
 Industries: electronics assembly, aerospace, agribusiness, automotive, IT and business process outsourcing, shipbuilding, garments, footwear, pharmaceuticals, chemicals, wood products, financial services, food processing, petrochemical, metalcasting and mining, real estate, textile, tourism
 Electricity – production: 106,115 GWh (2021)
 Agriculture – products: abaca, bananas, sugarcane, coconuts, durian, rice, corn, bananas, cassavas, pineapples, mangoes; pork, eggs, beef, pineapples,fish
 Exports – commodities/products: Semiconductors and electronic products, machinery, transport equipment, aerospace/parts, automotive/parts, garments, chemicals, copper,nickel, petroleum products, coconut oil, fruits
 Imports – commodities/products: electronic products, machinery, telecommunication and transport equipments, automotive, chemicals, petroleum, cereals, livestocks, cement and steel, fruits
 PMI Manufacturing: 52.7 (February 2023)
 Yield Curve: 10-Year Bond 6.27% (March 2023)
 Net International Investment Position: –$28.12 billion (2021 est.)

Government budget 

The national government budget for 2023 has set the following budget allocations:

See also 

 Bamboo network
 Emerging markets
 List of companies of the Philippines
 Newly industrialized country
 Tiger Cub Economies

References

Further reading
 
 
 Bhagwati, Jagdish and Anne Krueger. (1974). Foreign Trade Regimes and Economic Development. National Bureau of Economic Research.
 Hawes, Gary, And Ruth T. Mcvey. (2018) "Marcos, His Cronies, and the Philippines' Failure to Develop." Southeast Asian Capitalists (Cornell University Press, 2018) pp. 145–160.
 
 Kang, David C. (2002). Crony Capitalism – Corruption and Development in South Korea and the Philippines. Cambridge University Press. .
 Krinks, Peter. The economy of the Philippines: Elites, inequalities and economic restructuring (Routledge, 2003_.
 Villegas, Bernardo. (2010). The Philippine Advantage (3rd ed.). Manila: University of Asia and the Pacific.
 Yang, Lan, et al. "Can an island economy be more sustainable? A comparative study of Indonesia, Malaysia, and the Philippines." Journal of Cleaner Production 242 (2020): 118572.
 State of the Philippine Islands (1821) online
 Philippines – Asia's new tiger economy
 Philippines' opportunity point

External links

 Bangko Sentral ng Pilipinas (Central Bank of the Philippines)
 Department of Trade and Industry
 Department of Finance 
 Philippine Stock Exchange
 Department of Tourism
 Philippine Economic Zone Authority
Trade
 World Bank Summary Trade Statistics Philippines 2012

 
Philippines